Paulo Victor da Silva (born 3 January 1995), commonly known as Paulinho, is a Brazilian professional footballer who plays as a left-back for Danish Superliga club Midtjylland.

Club career

Early career
Born in São Paulo, Paulinho began his career with Santo André. He was loaned to Boa Esporte and São Bento, where he played in Série B.

Bahia
On 3 August 2018, Paulinho signed a three-year contract with Bahia. Three days after his signing, he made his debut in the top flight against Fluminense in 1–1 draw.

Midtjylland
On 1 July 2019, Paulinho joined Danish Superliga club Midtjylland on a five-year contract. He made his debut as a starter on 12 July 2019, on the first matchday of the 2019–20 season against Esbjerg fB in a 1–0 win. As part of the team, he won the league title that season.

The following season, Paulinho made his UEFA Champions League debut, playing his first match on 26 August 2020, in a qualifier against Ludogorets Razgrad which finished in a 1–0 win for his team.

During Midtjylland's UEFA Europa League campaign of 2021–22, Paulinho featured as a starter in all games.

Career statistics

Honours
Santo André
 Campeonato Paulista Série A2: 2016
 Copa Paulista: 2014

Bahia
 Campeonato Baiano: 2019

Midtjylland
 Danish Superliga: 2019–20

References

External links
Profile at the FC Midtjylland website

1995 births
Living people
Brazilian footballers
Brazilian expatriate footballers
Association football defenders
Campeonato Brasileiro Série B players
Campeonato Brasileiro Série A players
Esporte Clube Santo André players
Santos FC players
Boa Esporte Clube players
Esporte Clube São Bento players
Esporte Clube Bahia players
FC Midtjylland players
Brazilian expatriate sportspeople in Denmark
Expatriate men's footballers in Denmark
Footballers from São Paulo